The 32nd edition of the World Allround Speed Skating Championships for Women took place on 6 and 7 February in Helsinki at the Oulunkylä Ice Rink.

Title holder was the Netherlander Atje Keulen-Deelstra.

Distance medal winners

Classification

 * = Fall

Source:

References

1971 in women's speed skating
1971 World Women's Allround
Women's World Allround Speed Skating Championships
International speed skating competitions hosted by Finland
International sports competitions in Helsinki
Women's World Allround Speed Skating Championships

Attribution
In Dutch